Ukraine participated in the Junior Eurovision Song Contest 2016. The Ukrainian entrant for the 2016 contest in Valletta, Malta was selected through a national selection, organised by the Ukrainian broadcaster National Television Company of Ukraine (NTU). The semi-final took place on 13 August 2016, while the final took place on 10 September 2016. The winner was Sofia Rol with the song "Planet Craves For Love".

Background

Before Junior Eurovision

National final 
The Ukrainian broadcaster announced on 8 July 2016, that they would be participating at the contest taking place in Valletta, Malta on 20 November 2016. The semi-final of the national selection for selecting their entrant and song took place on 13 August 2016, while the final will take place on 10 September 2016.

Semi-final
The semi-final was held in the studios of the national broadcaster NTU on Saturday, 13 August at 10:30 CET. A professional jury selected 12 acts who proceeded to the national final which was due to take place on 10 September.

Final
The final took place on 10 September 2016, which saw twelve competing acts participating in a televised production where the winner was determined by a 50/50 combination of both public telephone vote and the votes of jury members made up of music professionals. Sofia Rol was selected to represent Ukraine with the song "Planet Craves For Love".

Jury members
The jury members were as follow: 
 Maria Burmaka - singer and composer
 Svitlana Tarabarova - singer
 Valentyn Koval - general director of the Ukrainian music TV channels M1, M2
 Vadym Lysytsia - composer and producer
 Viktor Knysh - stage director of the Junior Eurovision Song Contest 2013

Artist and song information

Sofia Rol
Sofia was born on 13 August 2002 in Kyiv, Ukraine. When she was four Sofia started attending the Ukrainian Song and Dance Ensemble, Zerniatko. The following year she attended the Sunflower Show Group, Soniakh, at the Kids and Youth Creativity House in Ukraine.

In 2008 she started working over her first album, Sofia Rol – for the Children of Ukraine which featured songs written by Iryna Kyrylina. The album also included karaoke versions of the songs and was released internationally in November 2009 and became popular with the Ukrainian diaspora.

Despite her young age Sofia already has a wealth of experience at performing at concerts and festivals and has won many prizes. In 2008 she won an award at Sim-Sim Festival in Kyiv and in December that year and in May 2009 she won the Sim-Sim Grand Prize. In June 2009 she won two awards, Popular Vocals and most popular Ukrainian Song at the Zorianyi Symeiiz (Starry Symeiiz) Festival in Yalta. She also won the audience choice award. In 2013 Sofia participated in the same festival, Zorianyi Symeiiz, winning first prize.

In October 2009 Sofia won the Grand Prize at the XIII all-Ukrainian Art Festival of Children and Youth called Funny Autumn Holidays – 2009 held in Kyiv. In 2010 Sofia took part in the television contests Krok Do Zirok (Step to the Stars), Nashchadky (Future Generations) Kumyry Ta Kumyrchyky (Big and Little Idols), Pisennyi Vernisazh (Song Vernissage).

In 2014 Sofia finished first in the Kyiv Art Time Contest and also participated in the Ukrainian national selection for Junior Eurovision. In 2015 she represented Ukraine at the Junior Sanremo Music Festival.

At Junior Eurovision
During the opening ceremony and the running order draw which took place on 14 November 2016, Ukraine was drawn to perform tenth on 20 November 2016, following Belarus and preceding Italy.

Final

Voting
During the press conference for the Junior Eurovision Song Contest 2016, held in Stockholm, the Reference Group announced several changes to the voting format for the 2016 contest. Previously, points had been awarded based on a combination of 50% National juries and 50% televoting, with one more set of points also given out by a 'Kids' Jury'. For the first time since the inauguration of the contest the voting procedure will not include a public televote. Following these results, three expert jurors will also announce their points from 1-8, 10, and 12. These professional jurors are: Christer Björkman, Mads Grimstad, and Jedward.

References

Junior Eurovision Song Contest
Ukraine
2016